{{Infobox magazine
| title          = The Marquette Journal
| image_file     =
| image_size     = 200px
| image_caption  = The Marquette Journal, Fall 2008 Cover
| editor         = Natallie St. Onge
| editor_title   = Editor-in-Chief
| frequency      = Quarterly
| circulation    = 3000 per issue
| category       = Student magazines
| publisher      = Marquette University
| founded      = 1904
| country        = USA
| based        = Milwaukee, Wisconsin
| language       = English
| website        = 

The Marquette Journal is an entirely student-produced magazine, run by the student media of Marquette University in Milwaukee, Wisconsin.

About
Published quarterly, the Journal highlights aspects of college student life not covered in the more hard news oriented Marquette Tribune newspaper. The focus of the magazine is on personal and special interest stories, and also has a strong emphasis on photography.

History
The Marquette Journal was first published in 1904, one of Marquette University's first student media outlets. During this time, one issue of the Journal was published per school year. In 1915, the Marquette Hilltop yearbook was first published, and the Journal transformed into a student literary magazine. The magazine was published for years in this format, but in the 1960s, the magazine began experimenting with publishing magazine feature articles along with the literary works of fiction that had previously dominated the Journal. In the decades that followed, the percentage of journalistic content versus the percentage of literary fiction changed from year to year, some years being almost completely literary and other years being almost completely feature writing. In the spring of 2006, the Journal staff began considering refocusing the Journal as a "student life magazine" entirely. The Journal replaced any literary content entirely with articles that related to Marquette's student body and the Milwaukee community as a whole. The Journals format as a student life magazine became permanent in Fall of 2007, under the leadership of Editor-in-Chief Erin Sheehan.

Staff
The official staff positions for the Marquette Journal have changed over the years in order to suit the needs of the organization. However, every year, one editor-in-chief is selected by the Diederich College of Communication Student Media Board. As of 2009, the official Journal staff is composed of an editor-in-chief, assistant editor, features editor, online content producer and copy chief. Also working on the Journal are a number of writers, copy editors, photographers and designers.

Editors-in-chief

Awards

2009 Society of Professional Journalists Mark of Excellence, Region 6: First Place, "Best Student Magazine."
2009 Society of Professional Journalists Mark of Excellence, Region 6: First Place, "Best Non-Fiction Magazine Article," Sara J. Martinez for "The Man, the Mission and the Moon."
2009 Society of Professional Journalists Mark of Excellence, Region 6: Second Place, "Best Non-Fiction Magazine Article," Alex Engler for "Labeled."
2009 Society of Professional Journalists Mark of Excellence, Region 6: Third Place, "Best Non-Fiction Magazine Article," Joey Kimes for "A Golden History."
2009 Society of Professional Journalists Mark of Excellence, Region 6: First Place, "Online Opinion/Commentary," Jesse Carpender for "Spectrum" blog.
2009 Society of Professional Journalists Mark of Excellence, Region 6: Second Place, "Online Opinion/Commentary," Patrick Johnson for "The Popular Opinion" blog.
2009 Society of Professional Journalists Mark of Excellence, Region 6: Third Place, "Online Opinion/Commentary," Alise Buehrer for "A's List" blog.
2009 Milwaukee Press Club Excellence in Wisconsin Journalism, Collegiate: First Place, "Best Blog," Patrick Johnson for "The Popular Opinion."
2009 Milwaukee Press Club Excellence in Wisconsin Journalism, Collegiate: Second Place, "Best Blog," Alise Buehrer for "A's List."
2009 Milwaukee Press Club Excellence in Wisconsin Journalism, Collegiate: Second Place, "Best Sports Story," Joey Kimes for "A Golden History."
2008 Milwaukee Press Club Excellence in Wisconsin Journalism, Collegiate: First Place, "Best Feature Story", Greg Shutters for "Milwaukee's Best."
2008 Milwaukee Press Club Excellence in Wisconsin Journalism, Collegiate: Second Place, "Best Web Site Design."
2008 Society of Professional Journalists Mark of Excellence, Region 6: First Place, "Best Student Magazine."
2008 Society of Professional Journalists Mark of Excellence, Region 6: First Place, "Best Photo Illustration," Kevin Kozicki.
2008 Society of Professional Journalists Mark of Excellence, Region 6: Second Place, "Best Photo Illustration," Jaclyn Poeschl & Greg Shutters.
2008 Society of Professional Journalists Mark of Excellence, Region 6: Third Place, "Best Photo Illustration," Brooke McEwen.
2008 Society of Professional Journalists Mark of Excellence, Region 6: Second Place, "Best Non-Fiction Article," Caitlin Kavanaugh for "Facets of Faith".
2008 Society of Professional Journalists Mark of Excellence, Region 6: Third Place, "Best Non-Fiction Article," Greg Shutters for "Milwaukee's Best".
2004 Society of Professional Journalists Mark of Excellence, National Competition: Finalist, "Best Student Magazine (published more than once a year)."
2003 Society of Professional Journalists Mark of Excellence, Region 6: First Place, "Best Student Magazine (published more than once a year)."

Current status
The Marquette Journal has undergone another major redesign for the 2008-2009 academic year. The staff has also increased its yearly number of issues from three to four, making it a true quarterly publication, a status it had not had since the year 2000.

External links

Student magazines published in the United States
Quarterly magazines published in the United States
Magazines established in 1904
Magazines published in Wisconsin
Marquette University
Mass media in Milwaukee
Triannual magazines published in the United States